Stephen Cole (born 1971) (also credited as Steve Cole, Tara Samms and Paul Grice) is an English author of children's books and science fiction. He was also in charge of BBC Worldwide's merchandising of the BBC Television series Doctor Who between 1997 and 1999 and as executive producer on the Big Finish Productions range of Doctor Who audio dramas.

In 2013, Ian Fleming Publications announced that Cole would continue the Young Bond series first penned by Charlie Higson, with the addition of four new books to the series. The first of these, Shoot to Kill, was published in the UK in November 2014, where Cole is credited as 'Steve Cole'.

Early life and career

Cole was brought up in rural Bedfordshire and attended the University of East Anglia between 1989-92, where he studied English literature and film studies, graduating with first class honours. After a brief time working in local radio with BBC Radio Bedfordshire (now Three Counties) he became a junior assistant at BBC Children's Magazines in 1993, and by 1996 he was Group Editor of Pre-School Magazines. In the summer of 1996 he wrote his first children's books: Cars on Mars, Alien Olympics, School on Saturn and Mucky Martians, a collection of pop-up poetry books published by Levinson the following year.

At the time, BBC Books had received rights to publish Doctor Who fiction after the release of the 1996 Doctor Who TV Movie – and that a new range of Eighth Doctor Adventures and Past Doctor Adventures would be commissioned. Cole applied for the role of Project Editor of Sci-Fi Titles as he was a fan of the programme, and was successful. 

After the first six books in the Eighth Doctor Adventures range were released, Cole also edited the BBC's Short Trips short story collections, for which he began to write under the pseudonyms of "Tara Samms" and "Paul Grice". He also wrote two novels under his friend's name, Michael Collier. He has since published other work under these pen-names, including the 2003 Doctor Who novella Frayed, part of a series published by Telos Publishing Ltd. He has also written several short stories and audio plays for Big Finish Productions.

In addition to the books he also commissioned and abridged stories for inclusion on various Doctor Who talking books and selected TV stories to be released on home video.

Original titles
Worn down by the grind of commissioning and editing 22 80,000 word novels per year as well as producing nonfiction titles, audiobooks and videos, Cole shifted roles in the Children's department to become Special Development Editor in 1999, commissioning and writing children's books tying into series such as Walking With Dinosaurs and Microsoap. He retained responsibility for certain of the Doctor Who novels on a freelance basis before passing them to the care of author-editor Justin Richards.

Leaving BBC Worldwide in October 1999 Cole moved to be Managing Editor for Ladybird Books. But while he continued to write TV and film tie-ins he missed involvement with fiction. After a stint as senior editor at Simon and Schuster Children's Books (where he commissioned books from Who writers Paul Magrs and Justin Richards) he went freelance in 2002, editing fewer books in favour of writing more of his own. Cole's first original fiction was a series called The Wereling, a trilogy of young adult horror books published by Bloomsbury. He followed this up with a further trilogy detailing the adventures of misfit criminal teen genius Jonah Wish and his friends – Thieves Like Us, Thieves Till We Die (also released as The Aztec Code) and The Bloodline Cipher. He has also written several more Doctor Who titles, including four tying in with the new series.

Cole's most successful titles to date are the Astrosaurs children's books, published under the name Steve Cole. The first two titles were published 3 February 2005. So far there are 22 Astrosaurs books available including a special edition book written especially for World Book Day 2007 (published 1 March 2007). Astrosaurs was followed up by the series Cows In Action (first two titles published 3 May 2007). There are twelve Cows In Action books published to date. The Astrosaurs spin-off series, Astrosaurs Academy, began in May 2008 and has 8 books to date.

Works

Astrosaurs
 Riddle of the Raptors, published 1 February 2005
 The Hatching Horror, published 1 February 2005
 The Seas of Doom, published 5 May 2005
 The Mind-Swap Menace, published 4 August 2005
 The Skies of fear, published 5 January 2006
 The Space Ghosts, published 2 March 2006
 The Day of the Dino Droids, published 1 June 2006
 The Terror Bird Trap, published 3 August 2006
 The Teeth of the T-Rex, published 1 March 2007
 The Planet of Peril, published 5 April 2007
 The Star Pirates, published 7 June 2007
 The Claws of Christmas, published 4 October 2007
 The Sun Snatchers, published 7 February 2008
 The Revenge of The Fang, published 7 August 2008
 The Carnivore Curse,  published 1 January 2009
 The Dreams of Dread published 4 June 2009
 The Robot Raiders published 28 January 2010
 The Twist of Time published 29 April 2010
 The Sabre Tooth Secret published 3 February 2011
 The Forest of Evil published 4 August 2011
 Megabookasaurus! published 3 September 2009
 Earth Attack! published 6 October 2011
 The T.rex Invasion published 26 April 2012
 The Castle of Frankensaur published 19 November 2012
 Astrosaurs vs Cows In Action: The Dinosaur Moo-tants, published 3 October 2013, (featuring the Cows In Action)
 Note: Steve Cole has also written a series on Tegg's training - see Astrosaurs Academy

Cows in Action
 The Ter-moo-nators, published 3 May 2007
 The Moo-my's Curse, published 3 May 2007
 The Roman Moo-stery, published 6 September 2007
 The Wild West Moo-nster, published 4 January 2008
 World War Moo, published 7 August 2008
 Battle for Christ-moos, published 2 October 2008
 The Pirate Mootiny, published 2 April 2009
 The Moo-gic of Merlin, published 6 August 2009
 The Victorian Moo-ders, published 1 January 2010
 The Moo-Limpics 4 October, published 2010
 First Cows on the Mooon, published 2 June 2011
 The Viking Emoo-gency, published 2 February 2012
 Astrosaurs vs Cows In Action: The Dinosaur Moo-tants, published 3 October 2013, (featuring the Astrosaurs)

Astrosaurs Academy
 Destination: Danger! – 1 May 2008
 Contest Carnage – 1 May 2008
 Terror Underground – 4 September 2008
 Jungle Horror – 5 February 2009
 Deadly Drama- 2 July 2009
 Christmas Crisis - 1 October 2009
 Volcano Invaders! - 1 April 2010
 Space Kidnap - 3 March 2011

The Slime Squad
 The Slime Squad vs The Toxic Teeth
 The Slime Squad vs The Fearsome Fists
 The Slime Squad vs The Cyber Poos
 The Slime Squad vs The Supernatural Squid
 The Slime Squad vs The Killer Socks
 The Slime Squad vs The Last Chance Chicken
 The Slime Squad vs The Alligator Army
 The Slime Squad vs The Conquering Conks

The Hunting, or Z Trilogy
 Z. Rex
 Z. Raptor
 Z. Apocalypse
 Z. Got 'em

Tripwire
 Tripwire
 Tripwire DEATHWING

Young Adult fiction

The Wereling Trilogy
 The Wereling: Wounded 2003
 The Wereling II: Prey 2004
 The Wereling III: Resurrection 2004

Thieves Like Us Trilogy
 Thieves Like Us  2006
 The Aztec Code 2007 (also published as Thieves Till We Die)
 The Bloodline Cipher 2008

Young James Bond
 Shoot to Kill, 2014
 Heads You Die, 2016
 Strike Lightning, 2016
 Red Nemesis, 2017

Doctor Who novels
 Parallel 59 (with Natalie Dallaire), 2000
 The Ancestor Cell (with Peter Anghelides), 2000
 Vanishing Point, 2001
 The Shadow in the Glass (with Justin Richards), 2001
 Ten Little Aliens, 2002
 Timeless, 2003
 Frayed, 2003
 The Monsters Inside, 2005
 To the Slaughter, 2005
 The Feast of the Drowned, 2006
 The Art of Destruction, 2006
 Sting of the Zygons, 2007
 Combat Magicks, 2018
 Time Lord Victorious: The Knight, The Fool and the Dead, 2020

Miscellaneous TV tie-in children's books
 The Adventures of Mr. Bean: Bear Essentials 2002
 The Adventures of Mr. Bean: No Pets! 2002
 Sea Captain Ned 2004
 The Thirsty Penguin 2004
 Josie's Big Jump 2004

Works published by Big Finish

Bernice Summerfield novels 
 The Gods of the Underworld (Bernice Summerfield)

Doctor Who plays 
 The Land of the Dead (Fifth Doctor) (1999)
 The Apocalypse Element (Sixth Doctor) (2001)
 The Wormery (Sixth Doctor, Iris Wildthyme with Paul Magrs) (2004)
 Fitz's Story (Eighth Doctor) part of The Company of Friends (2008)
 The Whispering Forest (Fifth Doctor) (2010)
 Kiss of Death (Fifth Doctor) (2011)
 Masquerade (Fifth Doctor) (2014)

Other plays 
 The Plague Herds of Excelis (Bernice Summerfield, Iris Wildthyme)
 The Dance of the Dead (Bernice Summerfield)
 The Relics of Jegg-Sau (Bernice Summerfield)
 Gallifrey: Square One (Gallifrey)
 Gallifrey: Spirit (Gallifrey)
 Gallifrey: Fractures (Gallifrey)
 The Devil in Ms Wildthyme (Iris Wildthyme)
 Many Happy Returns (Bernice Summerfield; with Xanna Eve Chown, Paul Cornell, Stephen Fewell, Simon Guerrier, Scott Handcock, Rebecca Levene, Jacqueline Rayner, Justin Richards, Miles Richardson, Eddie Robson and Dave Stone)

References

External links
 
 Interview with "Tara Samms" on the BBC Doctor Who website.
 Steve Cole Audio Interview: Cows, Dinosaurs and Doctor Who on Scottish Book Trust website
 Stephen Cole at Fantastic Fiction
 
 
 Samantha Cole and Tara Samms (pseudonyms) at LC Authorities, no records

1971 births
British children's writers
British science fiction writers
Writers of Doctor Who novels
People from Bedfordshire
Alumni of the University of East Anglia
20th-century British novelists
21st-century British novelists
Living people
Place of birth missing (living people)
20th-century pseudonymous writers
21st-century pseudonymous writers